Air New England, LLC is an FAR Part 135 certified Air Carrier that primarily operates twin-engine passenger aircraft in the United States and Canada. Their corporate headquarters are located at Portsmouth International Airport in Portsmouth, NH.

Operations 
Air New England primarily operates point-to-point charter air service in the Greater New England area with operational bases in Portsmouth, NH, and Auburn, ME. In addition to private charters, Air New England offers a service that they market as "shared charter service" where they put customers seeking a more economical option in touch with customers who have already chartered a flight in order to share the cost burden.

During the summer season, Air New England operates near-daily service between New York City, Boston, and destinations in Maine.

Fleet 

Air New England operates a fleet of twin-engine passenger aircraft consisting of Beechcraft Baron 58 and Beechcraft King Air C90 aircraft.

Accidents and incidents 

On 12 July 2018, an Air New England Baron 58 (Registration No.N263AC) on a non-commercial training flight made a wheels-up landing at Portland International Jetport. While there were no injuries, and the aircraft did not catch fire, the incident did result in a 90-minute closure of the airport causing many flights to either be delayed, diverted to other airports, or cancelled while the aircraft was removed from the airfield and a check was done of the runway.

On 19 April 2022, an Air New England Baron 58 (Registration No.N100JP) flying under the company's Part 91 certificate struck multiple runway edge lights during its takeoff roll resulting in damage to both propellers. This incident did not result in any injuries.

References 

Airlines based in Maine
Charter airlines of the United States
Companies based in Kennebec County, Maine
Waterville, Maine